Sky Rocket is a steel roller coaster located at Kennywood amusement park near Pittsburgh in West Mifflin, Pennsylvania. Manufactured by Premier Rides, Sky Rocket opened to the public on June 29, 2010. It was the first major coaster addition at the park in almost a decade following the renovation of Phantom's Revenge in 2001. It was also the first coaster in the park to feature inversions since the Steel Phantom as well as the first to have a launch since the Laser Loop.

The Sky Rocket occupies the ground near the entrance formerly occupied by Turnpike, an attraction that is expected to return to the park sometime in the future.

History
On August 12, 2009, Kennywood announced the park would build prototype a linear synchronous motor (LSM) launched roller coaster built by Premier Rides for the 2010 season. The coaster did not have a name at the time of its announcement, but the park eventually decided on the name "Sky Rocket", after its ride model. To make space for Sky Rocket, Kennywood retired the Turnpike, an electric antique car ride that had operated at the park since 1966. The Turnpike closed on August 16, 2009 and its cars were placed in storage with the intent that the ride be re-installed in the future, but as of 2023, this has yet to happen.  

The coaster's track arrived at the park in January 2010. Construction of Sky Rocket was completed in the spring of 2010. The ride opened exclusively to media personnel on June 28, 2010 before officially opening to the public the following day. 

For the 2017 season, riders were given the option of using a virtual reality headset when riding for a nominal fee of $5.

Due to damages caused by an electrical fire in the ride's engine room in May 2018, the ride did was not open for the majority of during the 2018 season. Park maintenance confirmed that the generator had been damaged beyond repair and were waiting on a new one being manufactured overseas. They also said they did not have an estimated date for reopening the ride at the time. The ride re-opened on July 14, 2019, after Kennywood announced via a Facebook video that the Sky Rocket would once again be open to riders.

Ride experience

After exiting the station, the train turns 180 degrees. It then lines up with the launch motors and is accelerated from 0- in 3 seconds. It goes up the  top hat element. As it goes over the edge of the hill, the train is slowed by a holding brake before it plunges down the 90 degree drop and enters a cutback inversion. A cutback is two half-corkscrews joined together in opposite directions so that the train exits moving 180 degrees from the direction it entered. It goes straight into a Zero-G Roll followed by a 180 degree upwards curve into the mid-course brake run. it comes almost to a complete stop only to plummet to the ground with a near-vertical drop. It goes into a low over-banked turn under the cutback, followed by a corkscrew over another piece of track, creating a head-chopper effect. It goes into another over-banked turn, followed by a series of S-curves to add to the excitement. It does one more 180 degree turn into a series of bunny hops going under the corkscrew. It does one final twist straight into the final brake run.

Trains

The two trains are painted red and black with the "Sky Rocket" logo on the front with flame decals. Both trains have two cars which carry six riders each. The ride also features a lap bar restraint system, which locks riders in at the waist and calves rather than the shoulders. This gives riders a sense of mobility not usually felt in coasters featuring inversions.

Notability
Sky Rocket is an electromagnetic launch coaster using linear synchronous motors (LSM), a first for Premier Rides designs. Premier had previously only used Linear Induction Motors (LIM) launches on their coasters such as Flight of Fear at Kings Island and Kings Dominion, and Mr. Freeze at Six Flags Over Texas and Six Flags St. Louis. LIMs require more electricity and are costly to maintain while LSMs are much more practical. It was also among one of the first roller coasters in the world to feature a cutback inversion, a rather common element seen on more recent coasters.

Awards

See also
 Superman: Ultimate Flight (Six Flags Discovery Kingdom), another Premier Rides roller coaster which is considered, by the manufacturer, as Sky Rocket's successor

References

Kennywood
Roller coasters in Pennsylvania
Steel roller coasters
Roller coasters introduced in 2010
Launched roller coasters
Roller coasters manufactured by Premier Rides